"Better Off Broken" is a song recorded by Canadian country music artist Lisa Brokop. It was released in 1999 as the fifth single from her fourth studio album, When You Get to Be You. It peaked at number 8 on the RPM Country Tracks chart in June 1999.

The song was also recorded by Tammy Cochran on her 2001 self-titled debut album.

Chart performance

Year-end charts

References

1999 singles
Lisa Brokop songs
Columbia Records singles
Songs written by Ron Harbin
Song recordings produced by Dann Huff
Song recordings produced by Paul Worley
Tammy Cochran songs
1999 songs